The Men's artistic pommel horse event took place on 7 October 2010 at the Indira Gandhi Arena.

Final

References
Results

Gymnastics at the 2010 Commonwealth Games